The tenth season of Chicago Fire, an American drama television series with executive producer Dick Wolf, and producers Derek Haas and Matt Olmstead, was ordered on February 27, 2020, by NBC. The season premiered on September 22, 2021, and contains the series’ 200th episode. In the 200th Episode, Matthew Casey left Chicago to move to Oregon. In the Season Finale, he returned to Chicago for Stella Kidd and Kelly Severide's wedding.

Cast and characters

Main
 Jesse Spencer as Captain Matthew Casey, Truck Company 81
 Taylor Kinney as Lieutenant Kelly Severide, Squad Company 3
 Kara Killmer as Paramedic in Charge Sylvie Brett, Ambulance 61
 David Eigenberg as Lieutenant Christopher Herrmann, Engine Company 51
 Joe Minoso as Firefighter Joe Cruz, Squad Company 3
 Christian Stolte as Firefighter Randall "Mouch" McHolland, Truck Company 81
 Miranda Rae Mayo as Lieutenant Stella Kidd, Truck Company 81
 Alberto Rosende as Firefighter Candidate Blake Gallo, Truck Company 81
 Daniel Kyri as Firefighter Darren Ritter, Engine Company 51
 Hanako Greensmith as Paramedic Violet Mikami, Ambulance 61
 Eamonn Walker as Deputy District Chief Wallace Boden

Recurring
 Randy Flagler as Firefighter Harold Capp, Squad Company 3
 Anthony Ferraris as Firefighter Tony Ferraris, Squad Company 3
 Cameron Scott Roberts as Griffin Darden
 Jimmy Nicholas as Chief Evan Hawkins
 Brett Dalton as Lieutenant Jason Pelham, Truck Company 81, Truck Company 72 as replacement for Lieutenant Boswell 
 Caitlin Carver as Paramedic Emma Jacobs
 Chris Mansa as Firefighter Mason Locke, Truck Company 81
 Katelynn Shennett as Kylie Estevez

Crossover characters
 Dominic Rains as Doctor Crockett Marcel
 Amy Morton as Desk Sergeant Trudy Platt
 LaRoyce Hawkins as Officer Kevin Atwater
Tracy Spiridakos as Detective Hailey Upton

Episodes

Production

Casting
On June 25, 2021, NBC announced that recurring cast member Hanako Greensmith who portrays Paramedic Violet Mikami had been upped to series regular. Series regular Jesse Spencer departed the series after the fifth episode, but returned as a special guest star for the season finale. Executive producer Andrea Newman became co-showrunner during the season, joining incumbent showrunner Derek Haas. The season is the last to feature a Dalmatian dog named Tuesday who died after filming for the season finale.

Filming
Filming for the tenth season began on July 20, 2021. On January 5, 2022, it was reported that filming had been suspended after several cast and crew members tested positive for COVID-19.

Ratings

References

External links

2021 American television seasons
2022 American television seasons
Chicago Fire (TV series) seasons